Oehlers is a surname. Notable people with the surname include:

 Aurelio Oehlers (born 2004), Dutch footballer
 Dwight Oehlers (born  1988), Aruban footballer
 George Oehlers (1908–1968), Singaporean politician and lawyer
 Jamie Oehlers, Australian jazz saxophonist
 Leroy Oehlers (born 1992), Aruban footballer
 Thora Oehlers (1913–1990), Singaporean physician

See also
 Oehler, surname